The Pedra d'Água River is a river in Bahia state in eastern Brazil. It is a tributary of the Peixe River in the municipality of Queimadas.

See also
List of rivers of Bahia

References

Rivers of Bahia